Joven Clarke is an Australian former rugby league footballer. He was one of the fastest players in rugby league in 2002.

Background
While attending Westfields Sports High School, Clarke played for the Australian Schoolboys team in 2000.
Clarke is of Filipino descent.

Playing career
Clarke played eight games for South Sydney between 2002 and 2006 and scoring 4 tries. He was an ex 100m sprinter with a best time of 9.89s.

Clarke was eligible for and selected in the national rugby union team for The Philippines "The Volcanos" playing two tests in the 5 Nations Asian Cup played in Korea in 2011.
He was also a member of the Australian Army team, they played a curtain raiser to the Australian/New Zealand test in 2011 at Skilled Stadium on the Gold Coast. Australian Army V Australian Navy

He was eligible for the Tomahawks, the United States national rugby league team, but was never selected. As an Australian, Clarke was eligible to represent for Australia but was never selected to play.

Footnotes

External links
Joven Clarke at NRL Stats
American National Rugby League

1983 births
Australian rugby league players
Australian people of American descent
Australian people of Filipino descent
Australian sportspeople of Asian descent
Sportspeople of Filipino descent
South Sydney Rabbitohs players
Rugby league wingers
Living people
Rugby league players from Sydney